Frances Bergen (née Westerman; September 14, 1922 – October 2, 2006) was an American actress and fashion model. She was the wife of ventriloquist Edgar Bergen and the mother of actress Candice Bergen and film and television editor Kris Bergen.

Early life
Bergen was born in Birmingham, Alabama, the daughter of Lille Mabel (née Howell) and William Westerman. Her paternal grandparents were both from German families. In 1933, her father died of tuberculosis, when Frances was ten years old. Shortly after, her mother moved the family to Los Angeles. She graduated from Los Angeles High School.

Career
As an actress, Bergen had supporting or minor roles in a number of films. She made her debut in Titanic (1953), after which she appeared in Robert Z. Leonard's Her Twelve Men (1954), and Douglas Sirk's Interlude (1957). During the 1958-1959 television season, Frances became the recurring love interest on the western show Yancy Derringer as Madame Francine, the strong willed but beautiful owner of a members-only gambling house in New Orleans set in 1868. She also was featured on a 1956 record, The Beguiling Miss Frances Bergen, accompanied by accordionist Art Van Damme.

Bergen also made numerous other appearances on television, with guest starring roles on The Millionaire, The Dick Powell Show, Barnaby Jones, MacGyver, and Murder, She Wrote.

She returned to films in the 1980s, with small roles in American Gigolo (1980), The Sting II (1983), The Star Chamber (1983), The Muppets Take Manhattan (1984), Hollywood Wives (1985) (starring her famous daughter), The Morning After (1986), and Made in America (1993). She also had a major part in Henry Jaglom's independently made film Eating (1990). She appeared on two episodes of Murphy Brown, her daughter's hit show, including Part One of the series finale in 1998.

Personal life
In 1941, Frances Westerman met Edgar Bergen after a radio program when he was 38 and she was 19. Westerman, who had graduated from Los Angeles High School the year before, was in the audience of Edgar Bergen's radio program as the guest of a member of his staff. Sitting in the front row, the young fashion model's long legs caught the attention of Bergen, who asked to meet her.

On June 28, 1945, the two were married in Mexico, after years of long distance courtship. They remained happily married until Edgar's death on September 30, 1978, at age 75.

On May 9, 1946, the couple welcomed their first child, Candice Bergen. Fifteen years later, on October 12, 1961, they had a son, Kris Edgar Bergen, who would later become a film and television editor.

Death
 
On October 2, 2006, aged 84, Bergen died at Cedars-Sinai Medical Center in Los Angeles of undisclosed causes following "a prolonged illness". She was not buried beside her husband Edgar Bergen, but rather cremated with her ashes interred at Forest Lawn Memorial Park in the Hollywood Hills area of Los Angeles.

Filmography

References

External links

Frances Bergen, 84, Actress and Model, Dies BY THE ASSOCIATED PRESS on October 8, 2006
In Loving Memory Of Frances Bergen, 84, Actress and Model Light a candle for her on ILMO.me

1922 births
2006 deaths
Female models from Alabama
American film actresses
American people of German descent
American television actresses
Actresses from Birmingham, Alabama
20th-century American actresses
21st-century American women